Pojan is a village and a former municipality in the Korçë County, southeastern Albania. At the 2015 local government reform it became a subdivision of the municipality Maliq. The population at the 2011 census was 10,864. The municipal unit consists of the villages Pojan, Zvezdë, Shëngjergj, Kreshpanj, Plasë, Zëmblak, Burimas, Pendavinj, Terovë, Rov, Orman and Rëmbec.

Notable People 
Mustafa Naili Pasha

References

Former municipalities in Korçë County
Administrative units of Maliq
Villages in Korçë County